Calopteron is a genus of net-winged beetles in the family Lycidae.

They are toxic and have aposematic coloration. Some species of moths are mimics (Lycomorpha pholus, Pyromorpha dimidiata).

There are about 13 described species in Calopteron.

Species
These 13 species belong to the genus Calopteron:

 Calopteron anxium Bourgeois, 1879
 Calopteron cyanipenne Pic, 1922
 Calopteron discrepans (Newman, 1838) (banded net-winged beetle)
 Calopteron leovazquezae Zaragoza-Caballero, 1996
 Calopteron megalopteron LeConte, 1861
 Calopteron quadraticollle Taschenberg, 1874
 Calopteron reticulatum (Fabricius, 1775) (banded net-wing)
 Calopteron scenicum Bourgeois, 1889
 Calopteron serratum (L., 1758)
 Calopteron terminale (Say, 1823) (end band net-wing)
 Calopteron terminatum Latreille, 1833
 Calopteron tricolor Olivier, 1790
 Calopteron tropicum (L., 1764)

References

Further reading

External links

 

Lycidae
Articles created by Qbugbot